
Alláh-u-Abhá (Allāhu Abhā "God is the Most Glorious") is a greeting that Baháʼís use when they meet each other. It can be compared to the takbir of Islam, Allahu Akbar "God is Great" or Subhan Allah "how pure is God".

One of the obligations Baháʼu'lláh set for his followers is to engage in a daily meditation that involves repeating the phrase Alláh-u-Abhá 95 times. Nader Saiedi explains that the significance of the number 95 originates from the Persian Bayán, where the Báb states that ninety-five stands for the numerical value of "for God" (lillāh), symbolizing the recognition of the manifestation of God and obedience to his laws, which are inseparable from each other, as confirmed by Baháʼu'lláh in the opening paragraph of the Kitáb-i-Aqdas.

The form  is the nominative case of Allah "God". The form  is the elative of the adjective  "beauty, brilliancy". In Baháʼí writings, it is usually translated as "most glorious". Abhá is a superlative of the word Baháʼ, and a form of the Greatest Name.

See also
Baháʼí symbols

Notes

External links
Bahai9.com: Recitation of 95 Alláh'u'Abhás

Bahá'í terminology

ru:Бахаи#Приветствие